The Augusta and Florida Railway (A&F) was incorporated in 1904 and operated a line between Keysville and Midville, Georgia, USA. The A&F was sold in pieces to the Georgia and Florida Railway in 1907 and 1910. Several lines in and around Augusta made connections to the line in 1907 in association with the Georgia & Florida purchase.

References 

Defunct Georgia (U.S. state) railroads
Railway companies established in 1904
Railway companies disestablished in 1910
Predecessors of the Southern Railway (U.S.)
American companies established in 1904